Volkhov Chudes (волховская чудь) were a Finno-Ugric people living along the banks of the Volkhov River, who spoke a Finnic language. The Volkhov Chudes lived upstream from Staraya Ladoga. Rahkonen's studies of local toponyms confirm that the Volkhov Chudes spoke a Finnic language.

In the southwest the toponymy has more similarities with Mordovic and Proto-Finnic, while in the southeast toponymy has similarities with Meryan toponymy.  It can be seen that the eastern Volkhov Chudes were very close to Meryans, culturally and linguistically.

Sources

References 

Baltic Finns
Leningrad Oblast